Masterpoints or master points are points awarded by bridge organizations to individuals for success in competitive bridge tournaments run under their auspices. Generally, recipients must be members in good standing of the issuing organization. At the international level, competitions and point awards are administered by the World Bridge Federation (WBF); its affiliates at the multi-national level, such as the American Contract Bridge League (ACBL), also issue points as do more local organizations such as the English Bridge Union (EBU), and the Deutsche Bridge Verband (DBV) and independent ones such as the American Bridge Association (ABA).

In general, each organization has its own scheme for the categorization of competitive bridge events and has a parallel scheme for awarding various categories of points to players who are successful in them. Upon reaching certain thresholds in point accumulation or retention, most organizations bestow a rank on the individual in recognition of their achievements. Points and rankings generally have no monetary value, but have prestige value for some players and are sought after by them over a lifetime of play.

In some cases, the point awarding scheme is an important means of raising revenue for the bridge organization insofar as they charge entry fees for each tournament where points are awarded and their availability acts as an incentive to participation; the more prestigious the points, the higher the entry fees.

In the past, points were issued in the form of paper certificates, which gave the player a tangible record of his or her achievement, but these are now increasingly replaced by electronic recording.

Awards of masterpoints

Players who achieve a high placing in an event sanctioned by the sponsoring bridge organization (a club game, sectional tournament, regional tournament, etc.) are awarded masterpoints according to their placing and the number of pairs, individuals or teams who played in the event.

Some events have an upper masterpoint limit, meaning that only players with a masterpoint holding under the limit may participate. This allows less experienced players more of a chance to place high since they will not be playing against players who are significantly more experienced. Additionally, some events are stratified. This means that players with various masterpoint holdings play together, but in the final standings, players receive masterpoints based on their position within their stratum. For example, if you are first in stratum C, second in B and fourth in A, and the upper masterpoint limits are 300 for C, 500 for B and 1000 for A, that means that among players with fewer than 300 masterpoints, you did the best. Among players with 500 points or fewer, you did second-best, and among players with fewer than 1000, you did fourth best. With those divisions, a player with 700 points would be able to place in stratum A, but not in B or C.

American Contract Bridge League
The ACBL awards several categories of masterpoints, each associated with the type of event and designated by a distinct color:
 Online - Also commonly referred as "unpigmented", are awarded in online club games
 Black - awarded in brick-and-mortar club games
 Silver - awarded in sectional tournaments, as well as Sectional Tournaments at Clubs (STaCs)
 Red - awarded in regional tournaments (for places other than overall and section tops), as well as North American Open Pairs (NAP) and Grand National Teams (GNT) games at clubs
 Gold - awarded for overall and section tops in regionals, as well as in NABCs (North American Bridge Championships) with an upper masterpoint limit of 750 or more
 Platinum - awarded in national-rated events with no upper masterpoint limit

Like most bridge governing bodies, the ACBL assigns ranks to players according to their masterpoint holdings; the requirements for its various ranks are listed below.

Masterpoints are partly a measure of skill, but the system is regarded by many players as a measure of experience and longevity rather than skill.  Experience is often related to skill, but not necessarily.  Over the course of a lifetime, a player can earn many points, just with average play.  For example, the same number of masterpoints, and hence the same rank, may have been achieved by Player A over 2 years and by Player B over 20 years.

When an ACBL member achieves the "Life Master" rank, the first digit of their 7-digit ACBL number is replaced with a letter according to the following chart.  (New membership cards are sent accordingly at that rank.)

"Masterpoint" is a registered trademark of the ACBL in the United States.

American Bridge Association
The American Bridge Association system of masterpoint ranking is as follows:

World Bridge Federation Master Points
In contrast, the World Bridge Federation system of Master Points annually reduces players' holdings of points older than one year by 15% and uses another classification of points, known as Placing Points, to record players' lifetime accumulation. The WBF also distinguishes between points earned in Open, Women's, Mixed, or Senior events and awards its Titles (such as World Grand Master), based upon the accumulation and retention scheme for the particular point classification.

Comparison of Masterpoints between organizations
It is difficult to compare masterpoints between various organizations as they are not consistent in value.

The ACBL awards new ACBL members 10% of their ABA masterpoints (up to a maximum of 200 ACBL black points) and 20% of their WBF masterpoints.

For tournament seeding, the ACBL uses 50% of a person's ABA masterpoints plus their ACBL masterpoints.

For tournament seeding, the ABA uses 200% of a person's ACBL masterpoints (if less than 5,000) plus their ABA masterpoints. If the player has 5,000+ ACBL masterpoints, they are seeded with 10,000 plus their ABA masterpoints.

Other rating systems
Elo rating system
 Lehman Rating System

References

External links
 American Contract Bridge League
 American Bridge Association
 World Bridge Federation
 English Bridge Union

Contract bridge
Rating systems